Marcel Busch (born 2 February 1982 in Heilbronn) is a German footballer who currently plays for SpVgg Neckarelz.

References

External links
 

1982 births
Living people
German footballers
VfR Aalen players
Rot Weiss Ahlen players
2. Bundesliga players
3. Liga players
SC Pfullendorf players
Association football defenders
Sportspeople from Heilbronn
Footballers from Baden-Württemberg